Events from the year 1935 in the United States.

Incumbents

Federal government 
 President: Franklin D. Roosevelt (D-New York)
 Vice President: John Nance Garner (D-Texas)
 Chief Justice: Charles Evans Hughes  (New York)
 Speaker of the House of Representatives: Joseph W. Byrns, Sr. (D-Tennessee)
 Senate Majority Leader: Joseph Taylor Robinson (D-Arkansas)
 Congress: 73rd (until January 3), 74th (starting January 3)

Key Events Of 1935

January–March
 January 3 – The trial of Richard Hauptmann, accused of the kidnapping and murder of Charles Lindbergh, Jr., begins in Flemington, New Jersey.
 January 4 – Dry Tortugas National Park is established in the Florida Keys, United States.
 January 11 – Amelia Earhart becomes the first person to fly solo from Hawaii to California.
 January 16 – The FBI kills the Barker Gang, including Ma Barker, in a shootout.
 January 19 – Coopers Inc. sells the world's first men's briefs, as "jockeys", in Chicago.
 February 7 – First known published use of the term "Ivy League".
 February 13 – Richard Hauptmann is convicted and sentenced to death for the Lindbergh kidnapping.
 February 22 – Airplanes are banned from flying over the White House.
 February 23 – The classic Mickey Mouse cartoon The Band Concert is released by United Artists in the United States.
 February 27 – The 7th Academy Awards, hosted by Irvin S. Cobb, are presented at Biltmore Hotel in Los Angeles, with Frank Capra's It Happened One Night becoming the first film to win all of the top five award categories, including Outstanding Production and Best Director. Victor Schertzinger's One Night of Love receives the most nominations with six.
 March 2 – Porky Pig makes his debut in Looney Tunes's I Haven't Got a Hat.
 March 19 – Harlem riot of 1935: A race riot breaks out in Harlem (New York City), after a rumor circulates that a teenage Puerto Rican shoplifter in the S. H. Kress & Co. department store has been brutally beaten.

April–June
 April 1 – The North American NA-16, prototype of the North American T-6 Texan or Harvard flying trainer, flies for the first time.
 April 14 – Dust Bowl: The great Black Sunday dust storm (made famous by Woody Guthrie in his "dust bowl ballads") hits hardest in eastern New Mexico and Colorado, and western Oklahoma.
 April 16 – Fibber McGee and Molly debuts on NBC Radio.
 May 6 – New Deal: Executive Order 7034 creates the Works Progress Administration (WPA).
 May 24 – The first nighttime Major League Baseball game is played, between the Cincinnati Reds and Philadelphia Phillies at Crosley Field in Cincinnati.
 May 27 – Schechter Poultry Corp. v. United States (the "Sick Chicken Case"): The Supreme Court of the United States declares that the National Industrial Recovery Act, a major component of the New Deal, is unconstitutional.
 May 30 – Eventual Baseball Hall of Famer Babe Ruth appears in his last career game, playing for the Boston Braves in Philadelphia against the Phillies.
 May 30 - June 2 – 1935 Republican River flood (called "Nebraska's Deadliest Flood") 
 June – National Youth Administration established.
 June 10 – Alcoholics Anonymous is founded in Akron, Ohio by Bill W. (William G. Wilson) and Dr. Dr. Bob (Smith).
 June 12–13 – Senator Huey Long of Louisiana makes the longest speech on Senate record, taking 15 hours and containing 150,000 words.
 June 13 – James J. Braddock defeats Max Baer at Madison Square Garden Bowl in New York City to win the heavyweight boxing championship of the world.

July–September
 July 5 – The National Labor Relations Act becomes law.
 July 16 – The world's first parking meters are installed in Oklahoma City.
 July 16 – Deportivo Saprissa is founded by Roberto Fernández in his shoe store in El Barrio Los Angeles in San José, Costa Rica.
 July 24 – The Dust Bowl heat wave reaches its peak, sending temperatures in Chicago to a record-high 
 July 27 – Federal Writers' Project is established.
 August 2 – The  is raised from Lake Champlain.
 August 5 – The Leo Burnett Advertising Agency opens in Chicago, Illinois.
 August 14 – U.S. President Franklin D. Roosevelt signs the Social Security Act into law.
 August 15 – Humorist Will Rogers and aviator Wiley Post are killed when Post's plane crashes shortly after takeoff near Barrow, Alaska.
 August 31 – As part of United States non-interventionism in the face of growing tensions in Europe, the first of the Neutrality Acts of 1930s is passed.
 September 2 – Labor Day Hurricane of 1935: The strongest hurricane ever to strike the United States makes landfall in the Upper Florida Keys killing 423. It is rated as a Category 5 storm with 185 mph winds.
 September 8 
Carl Weiss fatally wounds Huey Long, U.S. Senator from Louisiana ("The Kingfish"), in a shooting at the Louisiana Capitol Building in Baton Rouge.
Busby Berkeley is involved in three-car accident which kills three people and injures five, leading to charges of second-degree murder.
 September 23 – The Cleveland Torso Murderer begins a 3-year series of killings and beheadings around the Kingsbury Run district of Cleveland, Ohio; the perpetrator is never identified.
 September 24 – Earl W. Bascom and his brother Weldon produce the first night rodeo held outdoors under electric lights at Columbia, Mississippi.
 September 30 – U.S. President Franklin D. Roosevelt dedicates Hoover Dam.

October–December
 October 7 - The Detroit Tigers defeat the Chicago Cubs, 4 games to 2, to win their first World Series Title.
 October 18 – The 6.5  Helena earthquake affected the capital of Montana with a maximum Mercalli intensity of VIII (Severe), causing widespread damage and two deaths. A high intensity aftershock claimed an additional two lives on October 31.
 November 15 – Historical Records Survey begins under the Works Progress Administration. The then U.S. colony of the Philippines (Now independent) becomes a Commonwealth with Manuel Quezon as its president.
 November 22 – The China Clipper takes off from Alameda, California to deliver the first airmail cargo across the Pacific Ocean; the aircraft reaches its destination, Manila, and delivers over 110,000 pieces of mail.
 November 30 – The British-made film Scrooge, the first all-talking film version of Charles Dickens' classic A Christmas Carol, opens in the U.S. after its British release. Seymour Hicks plays Scrooge, a role he has played onstage hundreds of times. The film is criticized by some for not showing all of the ghosts physically, and quickly fades into obscurity. Widespread interest does not surface until the film is shown on television in the 1980s, in very shabby-looking prints. It is eventually restored on DVD.
 December 5 – Mary McLeod Bethune founds the National Council of Negro Women.
 December 9 – Newspaper editor Walter Liggett is killed in a gangland murder plot in Minneapolis.
 December 17 – Douglas DST, prototype of the Douglas DC-3 airliner, first flies. More than 16,000 of the model will eventually be produced.
December 26 – Shenandoah National Park is established within the Virginia.

Undated
 The house Fallingwater in southwestern Pennsylvania, designed by Frank Lloyd Wright, is completed.
 4 million members of trade unions in the U.S.
 Sacramento Credit Union is founded in California.
 The Melody Inn opens as a piano bar in Indianapolis.
 American Institute of Public Opinion, as predecessor of Gallup Group, a management consulting and worldwide research management institution business, founded in New Jersey, United States.
The Grand Gennaro, an Italian-American novel is published.

Ongoing
 Lochner era (c. 1897–c. 1937)
 Dust Bowl (1930–1936)
 New Deal (1933–1938)
 Great Depression (1929–1939)

Births

January

 January 2 – Jack Lemley, American architect (d. 2021)
 January 3 – Millard Fuller, American lawyer, founder of Habitat for Humanity (d. 2009)
 January 4 – Floyd Patterson, African-American heavyweight boxer (d. 2006)
 January 6
Gerald R. Molen, American actor and producer 
Nino Tempo, American singer
 January 7 
 Kenny Davern, American jazz clarinetist (d. 2006)
 Ducky Schofield, baseball player
 January 8 – Elvis Presley, American rock & roll singer, guitarist and film actor (d. 1977)
 January 9
 Bob Denver, American actor (d. 2005)
 Dick Enberg, American sportscaster (d. 2017)
 Earl G. Graves Sr., African-American publisher (d. 2020)
 January 10
 Eddy Clearwater, African-American musician (d. 2018)
 Ronnie Hawkins, American rockabilly musician
 Sherrill Milnes, American baritone
 January 11 – Walter Mears, journalist and author (d. 2022)
 January 12 – The Amazing Kreskin, mentalist
 January 13 – Rip Taylor, American actor and comedian (d. 2019)
 January 16
 Russ McCubbin, American actor (d. 2018)
 A. J. Foyt, American race car driver
 January 17 – Ruth Ann Minner, American politician
 January 20
 Dorothy Provine, American singer, dancer, actress and comedian (d. 2010)
 Joan Weston, American roller derby racer (d. 1997)
 January 21 – Raye Montague, American naval engineer (d. 2018)
 January 22
 Seymour Cassel, American actor (d. 2019)
 Pete du Pont, American attorney, businessman, and politician, 68th governor of Delaware (d. 2021)
 January 25
 Conrad Burns, American politician (d. 2016)
 Steve Demeter, American baseball player, coach and manager (d. 2013)
 Don Maynard, American football player (d. 2022)
 Richard M. Pollack, American mathematician (d. 2018)
 January 26
 Henry Jordan, American football player (d. 1977)
 Andrew J. Stofan, American astronautical engineer
 January 29 – Roger Payne, American zoologist
 January 30 – Richard Brautigan, American writer (d. 1984)
 January 31 – Hal Lear, American basketball player (d. 2016)

February

 February 2 – Raven Wilkinson, American dancer (d. 2018)
 February 3
 Johnny "Guitar" Watson, African-American singer, songwriter and musician (d. 1996)
 Jody Williams, African-American blues musician (d. 2018)
 February 4 – Collin Wilcox, American actress (d. 2009)
 February 5 – Colin Robert Chase, academic (d. 1984)
 February 7 – Herb Kohl, American politician
 February 10
 John Alcorn, American illustrator (d. 1992)
 Eddie Foy III, American actor, film director (d. 2018)
 February 11 – Gene Vincent, American guitarist, vocalist  (d. 1971)
 February 12 – Gene McDaniels, African-American singer, songwriter (d. 2011)
 February 13
 Carol Jarecki, American chess organizer and writer (d. 2021)
 Jacob Tanzer, American attorney (d. 2018)
 February 14 – Arnold Kopelson, American film producer (d. 2018)
 February 15 – Roger B. Chaffee, American astronaut (d. 1967)
 February 16 – Sonny Bono, American singer, actor and politician (d. 1998)
 February 17
 Johnny Bush, American country music singer, songwriter and drummer (d. 2020)
 Sara Ruddick, born Sara Loop, American feminist philosopher (d. 2011)
 Lucky Varela, American politician (d. 2017)

March

 March 1 – Robert Conrad, American actor (The Wild Wild West) (d. 2020)
 March 6 – Ralph Natale, American mobster (d. 2022)
 March 13 – Leon Burton, American football player (d. 2022)
 March 15
 Jimmy Swaggart, American televangelist
 Judd Hirsch, American actor (Taxi)
 March 17 – Bonnie Cooper, American baseball player (d. 2018)
 March 19 – Charlie Hennigan, American football player (d. 2017)
 March 22 – M. Emmet Walsh, American actor 
 March 23 – Edgar S. Cahn, American law professor and author (d. 2022)
 March 24 – Walter Moody, American convicted murderer (d. 2018)
 March 25 – Jim Miceli, American politician (d. 2018)
 March 27 – Stanley Rother, American Roman Catholic priest (d. 1981)
 March 28 – Jeanie Descombes, American professional baseball player
 March 30 
 Willie Galimore, American football player (d. 1964)
 J. Willard Thompson, American racehorse trainer (d. 2018)
 March 31
 Herb Alpert, American trumpeter
 Judith Rossner, American novelist (d. 2005)

April

 April 4 – Kenneth Mars, American actor (d. 2011)
 April 7 – Bobby Bare, American country singer, songwriter
 April 8
 David DiChiera, American composer (d. 2018) 
 Francis D. Moran, American admiral, director of the National Oceanic and Atmospheric Administration Commissioned Officer Corps
 April 10 – Ken Squier, American motorsports broadcaster
 April 11 – Nelson W. Aldrich Jr., author and editor (d. 2022)
 April 13 – Lyle Waggoner, American actor (d. 2020)
 April 14 – Katie Horstman, American female professional baseball player
 April 17 – Walt Kowalczyk, American football player (d. 2018)
 April 18 – Paul A. Rothchild, American record producer (d. 1995)
 April 21
 Charles Grodin, American actor, comedian, author and cable talk show host
 Thomas Kean, Governor of New Jersey, 9/11 Commission Chairman
 Dolores Lee, American female professional baseball player
 April 22
 Paul Chambers, American jazz musician (d. 1969)
 Jerry Fodor, American philosopher, cognitive scientist (d. 2017)
 April 23 
 Bunky Green, American jazz musician
 Charles Silverstein, American writer and LGBT activist (d. 2023)
 April 25 – Bob Gutowski, American athlete (d. 1960)

May

 May 2 – Lance LeGault, American actor (d. 2012)
 May 3 – Ron Popeil, American inventor and marketing personality (d. 2021)
 May 4 – Reginald Green, American development economist (d. 2021)
 May 6 – Edward M. Abroms, American film editor (d. 2018)
 May 7 – Hank Stackpole, American military officer (d. 2020)  
 May 9 - Nokie Edwards, American musician (d. 2018)
 May 11 
 Doug McClure, American actor (d. 1995)
 Dick Leitsch, American LGBT rights activist (d. 2018)
 May 12
 Hoss Ellington, American race car driver (d. 2014)
 Gary Peacock, American bassist and composer (d. 2020)
 May 15 – Don Bragg, American athlete (d. 2019)
 May 19 – David Hartman, American actor, television journalist
 May 21 – Johnny Majors, American football player and coach (d. 2020)  
 May 22 – Barry Rogers, American jazz, salsa trombonist (d. 1991)
 May 24
 Paul A. David, American economist (d. 2023)
 Joan Micklin Silver, American director (d. 2020)
 Rusty York, American singer (d. 2014)
 May 25
 Cookie Gilchrist, American football player  (d. 2011)
 Victoria Shaw, American actress (d. 1988)
 May 27
 Jerry Kindall, American baseball player (d. 2017)
 Ramsey Lewis, American jazz pianist and composer (d. 2022)
 Lee Meriwether, American actress
 May 28 – Charles J. Hynes, American lawyer and politician (d. 2019)
 May 30 – Bill Mallory, American football player, and coach (d. 2018)

June

 June 1 – Reverend Ike (Frederick J. Eikerenkoetter II), African-American televangelist (d. 2009)
 June 2 – Carol Shields, American-born writer (d. 2003 in Canada)
 June 6 – Miriam T. Griffin, American classical scholar (d. 2018)
 June 7 – Harry Crews, American novelist, short story writer and essayist (d. 2012)
 June 16 – John Leo, American writer and journalist (d. 2022)
 June 17 
 Peggy Seeger, American folk singer
 Rudolph G. Wilson, American professor, storyteller, writer and public speaker (d. 2017)
 June 20 
 Jim Barker, American politician (d. 2005)
 Len Dawson, American football player (d. 2022)
 June 21
 John Abbey, American actor  
 Monte Markham, American actor
 Tom Pratt, American football coach
 June 22
 Donald A. Bonner, American politician (d. 2021)
 Floyd Norman, American animator
 June 23 – Maurice Ferré, American politician
 June 24
 Charlie Dees, American professional baseball player
 Robert Downey Sr., American actor, filmmaker and father of actor Robert Downey Jr.
 Pete Hamill, American journalist, novelist, essayist, editor and educator (d. 2020)
 Ron Kramer, National Football League tight end (d. 2010)
 Terry Riley, American minimalist composer
 June 25
 Don Demeter, American outfielder, third baseman and first baseman in Major League Baseball
 Judy Howe, American artistic gymnast
 Larry Kramer, American playwright, author, public health advocate and LGBT rights activist (d. 2020)
 Fran Ross, African American satirist (d. 1985)
 June 26 – Pete Peterson, American politician and diplomat
 June 27 
 Dan Currie, American football player (d. 2017)
 Larry Krutko, American football player
 June 28 – Bob Blaylock, American professional baseball player
 June 30 – Stanley Norman Cohen, American geneticist

July

 July 1
 Neal Brooks Biggers Jr., American judge
 James Cotton, American blues harmonica player, singer, songwriter (d. 2017)
 July 2 – Ed Bullins, American playwright (d. 2021)
 July 3 
 Al Primo, American television executive (d. 2022)
 Harrison Schmitt, American astronaut and politician
 July 4
 Erich Barnes, American football defensive back (d. 2022)
 Roy Wilt, American politician
 July 5
 Brendan McCann, American basketball player
 Van B. Poole, American politician
 July 8 – Steve Lawrence, American singer, actor
 July 9 – Robert Pelletreau, American diplomat
 July 10 – Margaret McEntee, American Catholic religious sister, educator
 July 11 – Darrell Dess, American football offensive lineman
 July 12 – Ed Rubinoff, American tennis player
 July 13 – Jack Kemp, American football player, U.S. vice presidential candidate (d. 2009)
 July 15
 Ken Kercheval, American actor (d. 2019)
 Andra Martin, American actress (d. 2022)
 July 16
 Edward J. Nell, American economist
 Gloria Tanner, American politician (d. 2022)
 Lynn Wyatt, American socialite and philanthropist 
 July 17
 Diahann Carroll, African-American actress and singer (d. 2019)
 Benjamin Civiletti, United States Attorney General (d. 2022)
 Peter Schickele, American composer and classical musical parodist
 July 18 – Hall Whitley, American football player
 July 19 – George Breen, American competition swimmer (d. 2019)
 July 21
 Jeanne Arth, American Wimbledon and US Championships doubles tennis title holder
 Larry Hayes, American football player (d. 2017)
 July 22
 Grover Dale, American actor, dancer, choreographer and theatre director
 Steve Junker, American football player
 July 24 – Lowry Mays, American businessman (d. 2022)
 July 25
 Don Demeter, American baseball player (d. 2021)
 Barbara Harris, American actress (d. 2018)
 Larry Sherry, American Major League Baseball player (d. 2006)
 July 27 – Sarah Jane Sands, American professional baseball player
 July 28 – Ernie Bowman, American professional baseball player (d. 2019)
 July 29 – Friday Hassler, American racing driver (d. 1972)
 July 30 – Nick Meglin, American magazine editor (d. 2018)
 July 31 
 Richard C. Blum, American investor (d. 2022)
 Mort Crim, American television newscaster
 Geoffrey Lewis, American actor (d. 2015)

August

 August 2 – Hank Cochran, American country music singer/songwriter (d. 2010)
 August 4 – Carol Arthur, American actress (d. 2020)
 August 7 – Dave Ragan, American professional golfer (d. 2018) 
 August 8 – Joe Tex, African-American soul singer (d. 1982)
 August 12 – John Cazale, American actor (d. 1978)
 August 15
 Vernon Jordan, African-American lawyer, businessman and activist (d. 2021)
 Lionel Taylor, American football player and coach
 August 16 – Charlie Tyra, American basketball player (d. 2006)
 August 18
 Gail Fisher, African-American actress (Mannix) (d. 2000)
 Rafer Johnson, African-American athlete (d. 2020)
 August 19 – Bobby Richardson, American baseball player
 August 20 – Ron Paul, American author, physician, and politician
 August 22 – Annie Proulx, American novelist
 August 26 – Geraldine Ferraro, American politician (d. 2011)
 August 29 
 Thomas Stephens, American football player (d. 2018)
 William Friedkin, American film director
 August 30 – John Phillips, American singer-songwriter (The Mamas & the Papas) (d. 2001)
 August 31
 Eldridge Cleaver, African-American political activist and writer (d. 1998)
 Frank Robinson, African-American baseball player, coach and manager (d. 2019)

September

 September 1 – Guy Rodgers, American basketball player (d. 2001)
 September 2 – D. Wayne Lukas, American horse trainer
 September 8 – Teddy Mayer, American motor racing entrepreneur (d. 2009)
 September 10 – Mary Oliver, American poet, Pulitzer Prize for Poetry winner (d. 2018)
 September 12
 Harvey J. Alter, American virologist, Nobel Prize recipient 
 Donald Fowler, American politician (d. 2020)
 Al Swift, American broadcaster, politician (d. 2018)
 September 15 – Bill Jackson, American television personality (d. 2022)
 September 16
 Carl Andre, American minimalist artist
 Billy Boy Arnold, African-American singer and harmonica player
 Jules Bass, American film director, producer and co-founder of Rankin/Bass Productions (d. 2022)
 Bob Kiley, American public transit planner (d. 2016)
 September 17 – Ken Kesey, American author (d. 2001)
 September 19 
 Bob Krueger, American politician (d. 2022)
 Benjamin Thurman Hacker, American admiral (d. 2003)
 September 21 – Sigrid Valdis, American actress (d. 2007)
 September 20 – Jim Taylor, American football player (d. 2018)
 September 21 – Henry Gibson, American actor and comedian (d. 2009)
 September 22 – Milton Moses Ginsberg, American film director and editor (d. 2021)
 September 27 
 Junior Rodriguez, American politician (d. 2018)
 Dave Wickersham, American baseball pitcher (d. 2022)
 September 29
 Thomas Lockhart, American politician (d. 2018)
 Jerry Lee Lewis, American rock & roll musician (d. 2022)
 September 30
 Z. Z. Hill, American blues singer (d. 1984)
 Johnny Mathis, African-American singer

October

 October 1 – Walter De Maria, American minimalist, conceptual artist and land artist (d. 2013)
 October 2 – Bernard Lee, American civil rights activist (d. 1991)
 October 3 – Charles Duke, American astronaut
 October 4 – Jimmy Orr, American professional football player (d. 2020) 
 October 5 – Peter Brown, American actor (d. 2016)
 October 8 – Billy Brewer, American football player, head coach (d. 2018)
 October 11 – Daniel Quinn, American writer
 October 12 – Laurence Silberman, American lawyer and public official (d. 2022)
 October 14 – La Monte Young, American composer
 October 15
 Barry McGuire, American musician (Eve of Destruction)
 Bobby Morrow, American athlete (d. 2020)
 October 18 – Peter Boyle, American actor (d. 2006)
 October 20 – Jerry Orbach, American actor (d. 2004)
 October 23 – JacSue Kehoe, American neuroscientist 
 October 25 – Rusty Schweickart, American astronaut
 October 26
 Gloria Conyers Hewitt, African-American mathematician
 Ora Mendelsohn Rosen, American biomedical researcher (d. 1990)
 October 30 – Robert Caro, American biographer
 October 31 – Ronald Graham, American mathematician (d. 2020)

November

 November 1 – Charles Koch, American businessman, political donor and philanthropist
 November 5 – Frank DeCicco, American mobster (d. 1986)
 November 9
 Jerry Hopkins, American journalist, author (d. 2018) 
 Bob Gibson, African-American baseball player (d. 2020)
 November 13 – Michael Getler, American journalist (d. 2018)
 November 15 – Elizabeth Drew, American journalist and author
 November 19 – Jack Welch, American businessman (d. 2020)
 November 23 – Jean Havlish, American professional baseball, bowling player
 November 24
 Pervis Atkins, American football player (d. 2017)
 Ron Dellums, African-American politician (d. 2018)
 November 27 – Pat Fordice, American politician (d. 2007)
 November 29
 Diane Ladd, American actress
 Thomas J. O'Brien, Roman Catholic bishop, convicted of felony (d. 2018)
 November 30 – Woody Allen, American actor, comedian, and film director

December

 December 2 – David Hackett Fischer, American historian, author and academic
 December 3 – Eddie Bernice Johnson, African-American politician
 December 4 – Paul H. O'Neill, American politician (d. 2020)  
 December 5 – Calvin Trillin, American writer
 December 11 – Ron Carey, American actor (d. 2007)
 December 13 – Ken Hall ("Sugar Land Express"), American football player
 December 14
 Sarah Daniels, American pornographic actress, author of How to please yourself (d. 1969)
 Lee Remick, American actress (d. 1991)
 December 15 – John Taylor Gatto, American author and school teacher (d. 2018) 
 December 17 – Cal Ripken, Sr., American baseball player, manager (d. 1999)
 December 19 – Bobby Timmons, American jazz pianist (d. 1974)
 December 20 – William Julius Wilson, American sociologist and academic
 December 23 – Paul Hornung, American football player (d. 2020)
 December 25
 Stephen Barnett, American legal scholar (d. 2009)
 Anne Roiphe, American author and feminist
 December 26 – Al Jackson, American baseball pitcher (d. 2019)
 December 30 – Sandy Koufax, American baseball player

Deaths
 January 15 – Marion Howard Brazier, journalist (born 1850)  
 January 16
Ma Barker, criminal, leader of the Barker gang (born 1873; shot)
Fred Barker, son of Ma Barker and a member of the Barker-Karpis gang (born 1901; shot)
 January 19 – Lloyd Hamilton, silent film comedian (born 1899)
 February 15 – Harry Todd, actor (born 1863)  
 March 6 – Oliver Wendell Holmes, Jr., U.S. Supreme Court Justice (born 1841)
 March 12 – Mihajlo Pupin, physicist (born 1858 in Serbia)
 March 23 – Florence Moore, vaudeville and silent film actress (born 1886)
 April 2 – Bennie Moten, jazz pianist (born 1894)
 April 6 – Edwin Arlington Robinson, poet (born 1869)
 April 8 – Adolph Ochs, newspaper publisher (born 1858)
 April 11 – Anna Katharine Green, crime fiction writer (born 1846)
 May 3 – Jessie Willcox Smith, illustrator (born 1863)
 May 4 – automobile accident
 Junior Durkin, actor (born 1915)
 Robert J. Horner, film producer and director (born 1894)
 May 11 – Edward Herbert Thompson, archaeologist of the Maya civilization (born 1857)
 May 13 – John S. Cohen, U.S. Senator from Georgia from 1932 to 1933 (born 1870)
 May 19 – Charles Martin Loeffler, violinist and composer (born 1861 in Germany)
 May 21 – Jane Addams, social worker, recipient of the Nobel Peace Prize (born 1860)
 July 7 – George Keller, architect (born 1842)
 July 17 – Cudjoe Lewis (Oluale Kossola), the last known surviving male victim of Clotilda, the last ship of the Atlantic slave trade (born c.1941)
 August 5 – David Townsend, art director (born 1891)
 August 14 – Harriet Mabel Spalding, litterateur and poet (born 1862)
 August 15 – aviation accident
 Wiley Post, aviator (born 1898)
 Will Rogers, humorist and actor (born 1879)
 August 20 – Edith Roberts, silent film actress (born 1899)
 August 25 – Mack Swain, vaudeville actor (born 1876)
 August 27 – Childe Hassam, impressionist painter (born 1859)
 September 10 – Huey Long, politician (born 1893; shot)
 September 11 – Charles Norris, medical examiner  (born 1867)
 September 18 – Alice Dunbar Nelson, born Alice Moore, African-American writer and activist (born 1875)
 September 23 – DeWolf Hopper, actor and comedian  (born 1858)
 October 7 – Francis Wilson, stage actor and comedian (born 1854)
 October 12 – Loretta C. Van Hook, Presbyterian missionary and educator (born 1852)
 October 18 – Gaston Lachaise, sculptor (born 1882 in France)
 October 22 – Tommy Tucker, baseball pioneer (born 1863)
 October 23
 Charles Demuth, painter (born 1883)
 Dutch Schultz, gangster (born 1902; shot)
 November 6 
 Henry Fairfield Osborn, paleontologist (born 1857)
 Billy Sunday, baseball player, evangelist and prohibitionist (born 1862)
 November 8 – Mary Alice Quinn,  died at the age of 14 from a chronic heart condition (born 1920)
 November 27 – Charlie Green, jazz trombonist (born c. 1895)
 December 2 
 James Henry Breasted, Egyptologist (born 1865)
 M. Carey Thomas, educator (born 1857)
 December 9 – Walter Liggett, newspaper editor (born 1886; shot)
 December 14 – Stanley G. Weinbaum, science-fiction author (born 1902; lung cancer)
 December 16 – Thelma Todd, comedy film actress (born 1906; carbon monoxide poisoning)
 December 17 – Lizette Woodworth Reese, poet (born 1856)
 December 28 – Clarence Day, writer (born 1874)
 December 30 – Hunter Liggett, general (born 1857)

Date unknown
 Lillian Resler Keister Harford, church organizer, editor (b. 1851)

See also
 List of American films of 1935
 Timeline of United States history (1930–1949)

References

External links
 

 
1930s in the United States
United States
United States
Years of the 20th century in the United States